opened in Fukuoka, Japan, in 1999. The rotating displays of Chinese, Korean, and Japanese ceramics draw from the collection of some four hundred pieces.

See also
 Fukuoka Art Museum
 Kyushu Ceramic Museum

References

External links
  Fukuoka Oriental Ceramics Museum
  Collection Database

Museums in Fukuoka Prefecture
Buildings and structures in Fukuoka
Ceramics museums in Japan
Museums established in 1999
1999 establishments in Japan
Prefectural museums